Odumase (or Odumase Sunyani West) is a small town and is the capital of Sunyani West district of the Bono Region of Ghana. The number of inhabitants is 16,542.

Odumase is known for the Odomaseman Day Secondary School. The school is a second cycle institution.

References

Populated places in the Bono Region